Bishop Giulio Rossi (4 Jul 1754 – 2 Feb 1833) was a Roman Catholic prelate who served as Bishop of Pescia (1804–1833).

Biography
Giulio Rossi was born on 4 Jul 1754 in Pistoia, Italy and ordained a priest on 20 Sep 1777. On 29 Oct 1804, he was appointed during the papacy of Pope Pius VII as Bishop of Pescia. On 4 Nov 1804, he was consecrated bishop by Giulio Maria della Somaglia, Cardinal-Priest of Santa Maria sopra Minerva, with Ottavio Boni, Titular Archbishop of Nazianzus, and Benedetto Sinibaldi, Titular Archbishop of Ephesus, serving as co-consecrators. He served as Bishop of Pescia until his death on 2 Feb 1833.

References 

19th-century Italian Roman Catholic bishops
Bishops appointed by Pope Pius VII
1754 births
1833 deaths
People from Pistoia